Darbar in Iran may refer to:

 Darbar, Kerman (دربر - Darbar), a village in Kerman Province, Iran
 Darbar, Markazi (دربر - Darbar), a village in Markazi Province, Iran
 Darbar, Mazandaran (داربار - Dārbār), a village in Mazandaran Province, Iran
 Darbar, Semnan (دربار - Darbār), a village in Semnan Province, Iran